Hat Rock State Park is a state park in the U.S. state of Oregon, administered by the Oregon Parks and Recreation Department. The park is located off the east side of U.S. Highway 730 in Hermiston, on the south shore of Lake Wallula behind McNary Dam on the Columbia River.

Flood basalt

Hat Rock is a geological formation that, along with another outcropping rock in the park called Boat Rock, are thought to be exposed remnants of a 12-million-year-old basalt flow. Floods from the Ice Age eventually left these bedrocks, as well as others along the Columbia River Gorge exposed at the surface of the Earth.

See also
 Hermiston Butte
 List of Oregon state parks

References

External links
 

State parks of Oregon
Hermiston, Oregon
Parks in Umatilla County, Oregon
Volcanism of Oregon
Miocene volcanism